Derbyshire Dales is a local government district in Derbyshire, England. The population at the 2011 Census was 71,116.   Much of it is in the Peak District, although most of its population lies along the River Derwent.

The borough borders the districts of High Peak, Amber Valley, North East Derbyshire and South Derbyshire in Derbyshire, Staffordshire Moorlands and East Staffordshire in Staffordshire and Sheffield in South Yorkshire. The district also lies within the Sheffield City Region, and the district council is a non-constituent partner member of the Sheffield City Region Combined Authority.  A significant amount of the working population is employed in Sheffield and Chesterfield.

The district offices are at Matlock Town Hall in Matlock.  It was formed on 1 April 1974, originally under the name of West Derbyshire.  The district adopted its current name on 1 January 1987.

The district was a merger of Ashbourne, Bakewell, Matlock and Wirksworth urban districts along with Ashbourne Rural District and Bakewell Rural District. Following their review of parliamentary representation in Derbyshire, the Boundary Commission for England formed a new constituency called Derbyshire Dales.

Governance

Derbyshire Dales District Council is elected every four years, with currently 39 councillors being elected at each election. The Conservative party has had a majority on the council since 1976, apart from a four-year period between the 1995 and 1999 elections, when no party had a majority. The leader of the council since 2019 has been Garry Purdy, a Conservative. After the 2019 election, the council was composed of the following councillors:

The next election is due in 2023.

Places
Alsop-en-le-Dale, Ashford-in-the-Water, Ashbourne
Bakewell, Baslow, Beeley, Biggin, Birchover, Bonsall, Bradbourne, Bradwell, Brailsford, Brassington, Bretton
Calver, Carsington, Chatsworth, Chelmorton, Cromford, Curbar
Darley Dale, Doveridge
Earl Sterndale, Edensor, Elton, Eyam
Fenny Bentley, Foolow, Froggatt
Great Hucklow, Great Longstone, Grindleford
Hassop, Hathersage, Hognaston, Hartington
Kirk Ireton, Kniveton
Little Hucklow, Litton
Matlock, Matlock Bath, Middleton-by-Wirksworth, Middleton-by-Youlgreave, Monyash
Over Haddon
Parwich
Rowsley
South Darley, Stanton-in-Peak, Stoney Middleton, Sudbury
Taddington, Tansley, Thorpe, Tideswell, Tissington
Wardlow, Wensley, Winster, Wirksworth
Youlgreave

References

 
Non-metropolitan districts of Derbyshire